The Dent de Lys (2,014 m) is a mountain in the Bernese Alps (Swiss Prealps), in the canton of Fribourg.

Geography 

The Dent de Lys is the natural border of the municipalities of Châtel-St-Denis (west side) and Haut-Intyamon on the east side.

If we follow its south ridge, we can find Folliu Borna (1,849 m, the Vanil des Artses (1,993 m), the Cape au Moine (1,941 m), the Dent de Jaman (1,875 m) and finally les Rochers de Naye (2,042 m).

Climbing 

The col de Lys (1,783 m) allows the hikers and skiers to reach the summit of the Dent de Lys from the east and the west.

Ernest Hemingway mentions the Dent de Lys in his short story Cross Country Snow

On 25 March 1940, a roped party had an accident near the summit. Three climbers died. The only survivor, a Catholic priest, said he was saved by his prayers toward Marguerite Bays (a local girl that eventually became beatified in 1995).

Nowadays, some mortuary crosses can be seen with the name of those who died while tempting the ascent of the summit.

See also 
 le Moléson

References

External links 
 Les Paccots and Region tourism office
 Dent de Lys on Hikr

Mountains of the Alps
Two-thousanders of Switzerland
Mountains of the canton of Fribourg
Mountains of Switzerland